State Trunk Highway 341 (STH 341, WIS 341), better known as Miller Park Way, was the route designation of a segment of the oldest freeway in Milwaukee, Wisconsin, United States. It connected Interstate 94 (I-94) to WIS 59 (National Avenue), with a single set of off-ramps to Canal Street and American Family Field's parking lots.

Route description
WIS 341 started at an intersection with National Avenue and Miller Park Way. The highway continued north across a rail line to a folded diamond interchange with Parkway Drive, Frederick Miller Way and General Mitchell Boulevard. This interchange provides access to Miller Park and its surrounding parking lots. The highway continued north, and the WIS 341 designation terminated at an interchange with I-94 and Wisconsin Highway 175. The northern continuation of the roadway is WIS 175 along the Stadium Freeway. Ultimately, the WIS 175 designation replaced that of WIS 341.

History
WIS 341 was commissioned in 1999 after the reopening of the Stadium Freeway between I-94 and National Avenue. Due to the construction of Miller Park, the old Freeway had to be moved to the east by a few hundred yards. It was rebuilt as an arterial highway with a  speed limit and carried the designation US 41, when it reopened on August 6, 1998. US 41 was later rerouted in 1999 when the proposed plan to widen Layton Boulevard was successfully blocked by residents and city officials. Because Layton would no longer meet state highway standards, US 41 was rerouted to follow I-94. The section of the Stadium Freeway south of I-94 was given the WIS 341 designation in August 1999.

The Stadium Freeway, originally known as the South 44th Street Expressway for the street it would replace, was opened for traffic in 1953, just as the new Milwaukee County Stadium was opening to host the Milwaukee Braves of the National League of Major League Baseball. Original plans were to have the freeway extend south from National Avenue to the Airport Freeway in Greenfield (what is now I-894, I-41, and I-43). The interchange at I-894 was built, but since the Stadium Freeway was never completed to connect to it,  the ramps instead led to a park and ride lot at the corner of Loomis and Cold Spring Roads for commuter buses. Because of lawsuits and protest, the southern extension was never built, though most of the right-of-way for the freeway was cleared down to Lincoln Avenue in West Milwaukee. This section of South 43rd Street was renamed Miller Park Way in 2001, after the new park had opened.

Major intersections

See also

References

External links

 Miller Park website at The Milwaukee Brewers official website

341
Freeways in the United States
U.S. Route 41
Transportation in Milwaukee County, Wisconsin
Transportation in Milwaukee